Øivind Nerhagen (born 21 April 1958) is a former Norwegian biathlete.

Life and career
Born in the municipality of Trysil in the eastern part of Norway, Nerhagen is an educated agronomist.

Nerhagen debuted at the World Championship-level at the World Championships in Antholz-Anterselva in 1983. He also participated in the World Championships in 1985, 1986 and 1987 for Norway. His best individual finish at the World Championships came in 1985 in Ruhpolding where Nerhagen finished 15th in the 20 km individual. His best relay finish at the World Championships was a bronze which came in his first in 1983, which also would be his only medal at the World Championships.

In the World Cup, Nerhagen debuted in the first round of the 1981–82 World Cup in Egg am Etzel in Switzerland. Over his career he never finished on the podium individually, but he did finish in the top ten in multiple other races. Nerhagen did, however, come on the podium in the relay several times, once at the very top in the second round of the 1983–84 World Cup in Pontresina, Switzerland, though all came before the relays became official in the 1986–87 World Cup. After that, his best relay finish was a 4th in Antholz-Anterselva during the 1986–87 season. Nerhagen's best overall finish came in the 1983–84 World Cup where he finished 18th.

Ahead of the 1987–88 season, Nerhagen was not reselected for the Norwegian national biathlon team, and after that, he never again raced in the World Cup.

At home, Nerhagen won 13 medals at the Norwegian Biathlon Championships, of which three were gold.

Biathlon results
All results are sourced from the International Biathlon Union.

World Championships
1 medal (1 bronze)

*During Olympic seasons competitions are only held for those events not included in the Olympic program.

References

1958 births
Living people
People from Trysil
Norwegian male biathletes
Biathlon World Championships medalists
Sportspeople from Innlandet